{{Speciesbox
| image = Abraliopsis morisii.jpg
| status = LC
| status_system = IUCN3.1
| status_ref = 
| genus = Abraliopsis
| parent = Abraliopsis (Abraliopsis)
| species = morisii
| authority = Vérany, 1839
| synonyms =* Onychoteuthis morisii Vérany, 1839 
Compsoteuthis lonnbergi Pfeffer, 1900
Abraliopsis pfefferi Joubin, 1896
Abralia pfefferi (Joubin, 1896) Abralia jattai Pfeffer, 1912
}}Abraliopsis morisii is a species of bioluminescent squid in the family Enoploteuthidae. The species occurs in tropical to warm temperate waters in the Atlantic Ocean, including the Gulf of Mexico and the Mediterranean Sea. It can be found in the epipelagic and mesopelagic zones. It is rated as least concern by the International Union for Conservation of Nature (IUCN).

Description
Male specimens of A. morisii mature in between 120 and 130 days, and females mature in between 150 and 160 days; although, a mature female has been observed at 127 days and a mature male at 105 days. It occurs in the Atlantic Ocean, Mediterranean Sea, and the Gulf of Mexico. Its integumental photophores are scattered randomly and it has five ocular photophores. The hectocotylus contains a long flap at the ventral margin and a short flap at the dorsal margin. Females may have between 6,500 and 21,000 oocytes, which are 1.0 to 1.1 mm long.

Distribution
It has been found in areas with high nitrate, salinity, phosphate, and oxygen levels and also in areas with low silicate concentrations. It occurs over a large area and is classified as a least-concern species by the IUCN.

TaxonomyAbraliopsis morisii was described by Jean Baptiste Vérany in 1839 as Onychoteuthis morisii. It is also known by the synonyms Abralia jattai, Abralia lonnbergi, Abralia mediterranea, Abralia pfefferi, Abraliopsis pfefferi, Onychoteuthis morisii, and Teleoteuthis caribaea''.

Gallery

References

Abraliopsis
Taxa named by Jean Baptiste Vérany
Cephalopods described in 1839
Taxobox binomials not recognized by IUCN